Miguel Luciano (born March 5, 1972) is a Puerto Rican artist who lives and works in New York City. 

His work is included in the collections of the Smithsonian American Art Museum, the Brooklyn Museum and the Museo de Arte de Puerto Rico, San Juan.

References

Living people
1972 births
20th-century American artists
20th-century Puerto Rican sculptors
21st-century American artists